"Mean Streak" is a song by Cliff Richard and the Drifters (who would later become the Shadows), released in May 1959 as their fourth single. It peaked at number 10 on the UK Singles Chart.

Background and release
"Mean Streak" was written by former Drifters member Ian Samwell and producer Norrie Paramor under the pseudonym Joseph Seener. However, the latter is not originally credited on the release of the single.

Despite reaching a respectable number 10 position on the singles chart, "Mean Streak" would have fared better were it not having to compete in the charts with its flip side "Never Mind", which peaked at number 21.

Track listing
 "Mean Streak" – 2:00
 "Never Mind" – 2:01

Personnel
 Cliff Richard – vocals
 Hank Marvin – lead guitar
 Bruce Welch – rhythm guitar
 Jet Harris – bass guitar
 Terry Smart – drums

Charts
"Mean Streak"

"Never Mind"

References

1959 singles
1959 songs
Cliff Richard songs
Songs written by Ian Samwell
Columbia Graphophone Company singles
Song recordings produced by Norrie Paramor